Koko is a neighbourhood of Bouaké, Ivory Coast. It is located in the northwest quadrant of the city. Administratively, Koko is in the sub-prefecture of Bouaké-Ville, Bouaké Department, Gbêkê Region, Vallée du Bandama District.

Koko was a commune until March 2012, when it became one of 1126 communes nationwide that were abolished.

Notes

Former communes of Ivory Coast
Bouaké